Marcel Slodki (November 11, 1892–1943/1944) was a Polish-Jewish painter, graphic artist and stage designer.

References

Further reading

J. Sandel: Słodki, Marceli. In: Hans Vollmer (Hrsg.): Allgemeines Lexikon der bildenden Künstler des XX. Jahrhunderts. Band 4: Q–U. E. A. Seemann, Leipzig 1958, S. 299.
M. Wallis-Walfisz: Słodki, Marceli. In: Hans Vollmer (Hrsg.): Allgemeines Lexikon der Bildenden Künstler von der Antike bis zur Gegenwart. Begründet von Ulrich Thieme und Felix Becker. Band 31: Siemering–Stephens. E. A. Seemann, Leipzig 1937, S. 140.

External links
Unauthorized Salvadoran citizenship certificate issued to Marcel Slodki (b. November 8, 1892 in Lodz) by George Mandel-Mantello, First Secretary of the Salvadoran Consulate in Switzerland and sent to him in the Drancy transit camp

1892 births
1943 deaths

Polish people who died in Auschwitz concentration camp
Polish painters of Jewish descent